The Star Peak Group is a geologic group in Nevada. It preserves fossils dating back to the Triassic period. The group is named for Star Peak.

See also

 List of fossiliferous stratigraphic units in Nevada
 Paleontology in Nevada

References
 

Geologic groups of Nevada
Triassic System of North America